Abhimanyu Raj Singh is an Indian producer, who mainly produces Hindi-language television shows. He is the founder of production company, Contiloe Entertainment, which he co-founded with his brother, Aditya Narain Singh in 1995.

Early life
Abhimanyu was born in New Delhi. He did his schooling from The Doon School, Dehradun and did his graduation from St. Stephen's College. He has two brothers Chandrachur Singh and Aditya Narain Singh.

Filmography

Films

Web Shows

Television

Awards and nominations

References

External links
 

Indian producers
Living people
Year of birth missing (living people)
Indian television producers
Hindi film producers